Chirp (also known as Asio Limited) was a technology company based in the UK. Chirp was originally a research project from UCL and was incorporated as a UK limited company in 2012. Chirp specialised in data-over-sound software development kits, which converted data into audio signals, which could be transmitted to other devices within hearing range

Chirp had been involved in projects with EDF Energy, Activision Blizzard, for the Skylanders: Imaginators game and Creata, in toys for the Netflix Original, Beat Bugs

On 13 February 2020, Chirp announced its IP and assets had been acquired by Sonos for an undisclosed amount, and that Chirp's SDKs will no longer accessible to the public from 1 March 2020.

References 

Information technology companies of the United Kingdom